Euryoryzomys legatus, also known as the Tarija oryzomys or big-headed rice rat, is a species of rodent in the family Cricetidae. It now belongs to the genus Euryoryzomys, having previously been placed in Oryzomys. It is found in the eastern Andes of northwestern Argentina and southern Bolivia.

References

Literature cited
Musser, G. G. and M. D. Carleton. 2005. Superfamily Muroidea. pp. 894–1531 in Mammal Species of the World a Taxonomic and Geographic Reference. D. E. Wilson and D. M. Reeder eds. Johns Hopkins University Press, Baltimore.

Euryoryzomys
Rodents of South America
Mammals of Argentina
Mammals of Bolivia
Mammals described in 1925
Taxa named by Oldfield Thomas
Taxonomy articles created by Polbot